Jonathan Ricardo Glenn (born 27 August 1987) is a Trinidad and Tobago football coach and former international player. He played college football for Saint Leo University in the United States before going on a decade long professional career.

Early life
Glenn was raised in Maloney Gardens, Tunapuna–Piarco, Trinidad. He attended St. Anthony's College in Diego Martin before moving to the United States to play at Saint Leo University in Florida, where he studied psychology and marketing.

Playing career

College
In his freshman season at Saint Leo in 2007, Glenn scored 14 goals in 13 matches, ranking fourth in NCAA Division II in goals per match. He received the Sunshine State Conference Freshman of the Year award, and was named a Second Team All-SSC selection, and along with a National Soccer Coaches Association of America (NSCAA)/Adidas All-South Region Second Team award. In 2008, following his sophomore season, he again received Second Team All-SCC and NSCAA/Adidas All-South Region Second Team honors. After scoring 9 goals in 15 games in his junior season, including his first career hat trick in a game against Georgia Southwestern State University, Glenn once again was named to the All-SSC Second Team, and to the Daktronics NCAA Division II All-South Region Second Team. Glenn finished his career at Saint Leo in 2010, and in his senior season he was named to the SSC All-Conference Team, and to the CoSIDA Academic All-District Team. In total, he scored 41 goals across 57 matches in his college career, which was then fifth highest in Saint Leo history.

Club
Glenn began his club career while still at Saint Leo in 2008 with the Panama City Beach Pirates of the USL Premier Development League, where he played in 5 matches without scoring a goal. He returned to the PDL in 2010, playing for the Vermont Voltage, scoring 5 goals in 20 matches across his two seasons with the club. He then moved to Jacksonville United FC of the National Premier Soccer League, where he was named to the All-Conference team in the Sunshine Conference in 2012.

In February 2014, Glenn moved to Iceland, when he signed for ÍBV of the Úrvalsdeild. He had a successful first season in Iceland, scoring 12 goals in 20 matches, second-most in the league. He received ÍBV's Golden Boot, along with the club's Player of the Year award.

On 28 July 2017, Glenn moved to North Carolina FC alongside teammate Danny Barrow in exchange for Brian Shriver who went to Jacksonville Armada.

In November 2022, he retired from professional football.

International
After his first season with ÍBV, Glenn was named to the Trinidad and Tobago national team for the 2014 Caribbean Cup. He appeared in two matches in the tournament, coming on as a substitute against Curaçao and Cuba. The Soca Warriors finished runners-up to Jamaica in the tournament.

Managerial career
In November 2021, Glenn was hired as the manager of ÍBV women's football team. Despite the team finishing 6th and playing well above expectations, with Glenn being named the best coach of the first half of the season by Fótbolti.net, he was sacked following the season.

Personal life
Glenn is married to footballer Þórhildur Ólafsdóttir.

References

External links

1987 births
Living people
2014 Caribbean Cup players
2015 CONCACAF Gold Cup players
Association football forwards
Jonathan Glenn
Jonathan Glenn
Jonathan Glenn
Jonathan Glenn
Jacksonville Armada FC players
North Carolina FC players
Panama City Beach Pirates players
USL League Two players
Saint Leo Lions men's basketball players
Trinidad and Tobago footballers
Trinidad and Tobago international footballers
Vermont Voltage players